Minuscule 215 (in the Gregory-Aland numbering), A134 (Soden), is a Greek minuscule manuscript of the New Testament, on parchment. Paleographically it has been assigned to the 11th century. It has full marginalia.

Description 

The codex contains a complete text of the four Gospels, on 272 parchment leaves (size ), with a commentary. The text is written in one column per page, 24 lines per page (biblical text). The commentary on Matthew is by Chrysostomos, that on Mark, Victorinus of Pettau, Luke, Titus of Bostra, that on John is by Chrysostomos.

There is also a division according to the Ammonian Sections (in Mark 237 sections, the last in 16:14), with references to the Eusebian Canons (written below Ammonian Section numbers).

It has the famous Jerusalem Colophon ("from the ancient manuscripts of Jerusalem").

The manuscript is a duplicate of the codex 20 and 300, as well in its text as in the subscriptions and commentary, being without any later corrections seen in codex 20.

Text 

The Greek text of the codex is a representative of the Byzantine text-type. Aland placed it in Category V.

It was not examined by using Claremont Profile Method.

History 

It was examined by Birch, Burgon, and Riccoboni. C. R. Gregory saw the manuscript in 1886.

It is currently housed at the Biblioteca Marciana (Gr. Z 544 (591)), at Venice.

See also 

 List of New Testament minuscules
 Biblical manuscript
 Textual criticism

References

Further reading 

 

Greek New Testament minuscules
11th-century biblical manuscripts